Lucrezia Donati (Florence, Italy; 1447-ibidem, 1501) was an Italian noblewoman, mistress of Lorenzo de' Medici.

The identity of the woman in the sculpture Dama col mazzolino, at Bargello Museum in Florence could be attributed  to Lucrezia Donati. Also Sandro Botticelli's painting Fortitude would be another representation of her.

Biography 
Lucrezia was the daughter of Manno Donati and Caterina Bardi, a Florentine dame who belonged to an extinct family tree, being the last descendant. From 1461 was the mistress of Lorenzo il Magnifico, a platonic love, until Lorenzo later married the Italian noble Clarice Orsini. In 1486 Lorenzo remembered the poems he had written for her when he was 16 in the poem Corinto.

Lucrezia married the Florentian businessman Niccolò Ardighelli, who died in exile in 1496.

Popular culture 
The actress Laura Haddock starred as Lucrezia Donati in the television series Da Vinci's Demons. Alessandra Mastronardi played Lucrezia in Medici: The Magnificent.

References

Bibliography

External links 

1447 births
1501 deaths
Lucrezia
Mistresses of Italian royalty
15th-century Italian women